RCAF Station Oshawa was a training station of the British Commonwealth Air Training Plan (BCATP) during World War II located near Oshawa, Ontario, Canada.

The No. 20 Elementary Flying Training School (EFTS) was located in Oshawa from June 1941 to December 1944. Student flyers used Tiger Moth aircraft and were trained by civilian instructors from the Oshawa, Kingston, and Brant-Norfolk flying clubs. A relief landing field was located at Whitby (at Hopkins Street and Gerdau Court now an industrial site).

The military left in 1944 but as federal owned until sale to then Town of Oshawa in 1947. The airport is still in use as the Oshawa Executive Airport.

Aerodrome Information
The aerodrome was listed with three runways as follows:

Relief landing field - Whitby
The aerodrome was listed as a "Turf - All-way field - Rectangular field."

References 

Oshawa
Oshawa
Buildings and structures in Oshawa
Military airbases in Ontario
Defunct airports in Ontario
Transport in Oshawa
Military history of Ontario
Military installations closed in 1944
1944 disestablishments in Ontario
History of transport in the Regional Municipality of Durham